O Taeseok  (11 October 1940 – 28 November 2022) was a South Korean playwright, theatre director and translator.

Life
O Taeseok was born on 11 October 1940, in Seocheon, South Chungcheong Province, South Korea. O Taeseok was ten years old when the Korean War began, causing his childhood to be torn apart. His father, a politician, was kidnapped, causing O Taeseok, along with his grandmother, to become a refugee, where he witnessed countless deaths. O Taeseok later received a degree in philosophy from Yonsei University in 1963, and immediately threw himself into writing and directing.

O died on 28 November 2022, at the age of 82.

Work
O Taeseok is most well-known as a theatre director and playwright who is extremely adept at portraying Korean life and state of mind. O Taeseok's plays have many elements in common with traditional Korean plays. On stage the characters of his plays do not carry on static, realistic conversations, but rather engage in vibrant song and dance or wear animal masks while dashing about on stage; exaggerated movements and make-up are also frequently used. Despite the loud, raucous atmosphere on stage, O Taeseok's work depicts the darkness of pain and the shadows of death. The story behind this lies in his childhood memories.

O Taeseok made his formal literary debut with his play Wedding Dress, which was recognized at the 1967 New Years Literary Arts Competition sponsored by the Chosun Ilbo, and Change of Season, which won a prize in a 1968 open playwriting competition co-sponsored by the National Theatre and the Kyunghyang Daily News. In 1968 and 1969 his plays Change of Season, Judas, Before the Rooster Crows, Outing, and Self-Righting Doll on Roller Skates were performed in several avant-garde theatres. He next took up residence with the Dongnang Repertory Company, where he directed Lubeu, and continued to direct and write.

Works in translation
 
 The Metacultural Theater of Oh T'ae-Sŏk: Five Plays from the Korean Avant-Garde (University of Hawaiʻi Press, 1999), translated by Kim Ah-Jeong and Robert B. Graves 

Works in Korean (partial)
Plays
 Wedding Dress
 Grass Burial
 Lifecord
 Chunpung's Wife
 Splash 
 Between Father and Son 
 Bicycle
 Dream of a Lowly Man
 Greenhouse
 Change of Season
 Judas, Before the Rooster Crows
 Outing
 Self-Righting Doll on Roller Skates
 Africa
 Why Did Sim Cheong Throw Herself into the Indangsu Twice?

Stories
 Unhappy Times (1962)

Translations
 Leaf Storm (1955)
 No One Writes to the Colonel (1956)
 Big Mama's Funeral (1962)
 One Hundred Years of Solitude (1967)
 The Incredible and Sad Tale of Innocent Eréndira and Her Heartless Grandmother (1972)
 The Autumn of the Patriarch (1975)
 Chronicle of a Death Foretold (1981)
 Love in the Time of Cholera (1985)
 The General in His Labyrinth (1989)
 Of Love and Other Demons (1994)
 News of a Kidnapping (1996)

Awards
 Hankook Ilbo Theater and Film Prize in 1973 (for Grass Burial'')
 Seoul Theatre Festival Grand Prize in 1987

References

1940 births
2022 deaths
South Korean translators
South Korean dramatists and playwrights
Yonsei University alumni
People from South Chungcheong Province
20th-century male writers
20th-century dramatists and playwrights
20th-century translators
South Korean male writers
Male dramatists and playwrights
20th-century South Korean writers
21st-century South Korean writers
21st-century male writers
21st-century dramatists and playwrights